Torodora parotidosa is a moth in the family Lecithoceridae. It was described by Chun-Sheng Wu in 1994. It is found in China (Guangdong) and Thailand.

The wingspan is about 19 mm.

References

Moths described in 1994
Torodora